Izidoro Kosinski (1 April 1932 – 15 September 2017) was a Roman Catholic bishop.

Ordained to the priesthood in 1957, Kosinski served as bishop of the Roman Catholic Diocese of Três Lagoas Brazil, from 1981 until 2009.

Notes

1932 births
2017 deaths
21st-century Roman Catholic bishops in Brazil
20th-century Roman Catholic bishops in Brazil
Roman Catholic bishops of Três Lagoas